The Federation of Canadian Municipalities (FCM,  Fédération canadienne des municipalités) is an advocacy group representing over 2000 Canadian municipalities.  It is an organization with no formal power but significant ability to influence debate and policy, as it is a main national lobby group of mayors, councillors and other elected municipal officials.  It negotiates with the Government of Canada's departments and agencies on behalf of municipalities, and provides fund administration services for the Government of Canada's departments and agencies.

History
In 1901, the Union of Canadian Municipalities was formed to represent the interests of municipal governments. Another association, the Dominion Conference of Mayors was established in 1935. In 1937, these two associations were amalgamated into the Canadian Federation of Mayors and Municipalities which in 1976 would be renamed the Federation of Canadian Municipalities.

FCM was instrumental in negotiating the federal government's 2005 "New Deal for Cities" programme, under which Canadian federal gasoline taxes are remitted to municipalities.

Outputs
Infrastructure:

• Flow-through for $2 billion of federal funds to municipalities from a Gas Tax Fund. 

• Worked to address municipal infrastructure deficit. Changes in federal policy are not attributable to any specific group or campaign. "In the 2009 budget, the federal government committed more than $12 billion over two years in new and accelerated infrastructure funding to municipal priorities."

Environment: 

• Flow-through for federal funds to support municipal initiatives that improve air, water and soil quality, and protect the climate through the Green Municipal Fund's below-market loans, grants, education and training. This programme was established by the Chrétien government in 2001 with $100 million "to stimulate investment in innovative municipal infrastructure", and "to support municipal government action to cut pollution, reduce greenhouse gases and improve quality of life".

International development: 

• Flow-through for federal aid for development cooperation in more than 40 countries across Asia, Africa, the Middle East, Latin America and the Caribbean since 1987.

List of FCM Presidents

See also
 List of local government organizations

Notes

References

Bibliography

External links
 

Civic and political organizations of Canada
Local government organizations
Government agencies established in 1937
Local government in Canada
1937 establishments in Ontario
UCLG Sections